Losers (Karatsi) is a 2015 Bulgarian comedy-drama film directed by Ivaylo Hristov. It won the Golden George  at the 2015 Moscow International Film Festival. It was selected as the Bulgarian entry for the Best Foreign Language Film at the 89th Academy Awards but it was not nominated.

Cast
 Elena Telbis
 Deyan Donkov
 Ovanes Torosian
 Georgi Gotzin
 Plamen Dimov

See also
 List of submissions to the 89th Academy Awards for Best Foreign Language Film
 List of Bulgarian submissions for the Academy Award for Best Foreign Language Film

References

External links
 

2015 films
2015 comedy-drama films
2010s Bulgarian-language films
Bulgarian comedy-drama films
Films set in Bulgaria
Films shot in Bulgaria